The Face in the Fog is a 1922 American silent film produced by Cosmopolitan Productions and distributed by Paramount Pictures. It was directed by Alan Crosland and starred Lionel Barrymore. An incomplete print is preserved at the Library of Congress.

Cast
Lionel Barrymore – Boston Blackie Dawson
Seena Owen – Grand Duchess Tatiana
Lowell Sherman – Count Alexis Orloff
George Nash – Huck Kant
Louis Wolheim – Petrus
Mary MacLaren – Mary Dawson
Macey Harlam – Count Ivan
Gustav von Seyffertitz – Michael
Joe King – Detective Wren
Tom Blake – Surtep
Marie Burke – Olga
Joseph W. Smiley – Police Captain
Martin Faust – Ivan's valet
Mario Majeroni – Grand Duke Alexis

References

External links

Lantern slide plate

1922 films
American silent feature films
Films directed by Alan Crosland
1922 mystery films
American mystery films
American black-and-white films
Boston Blackie films
1920s American films
Silent mystery films